Heteroceras is a Lower Cretaceous heteromorph ammonite belonging to the ancyloceratoidean family, Heteroceratidae.

Description 
It is characterized by a helically coiled juvenile shell at the apex followed by slightly curved adult shaft, with a J-shaped section at the end of it.  The shell is ribbed; ribs are concave and oblique on the helix, straight and transverse on the later stages.

Distribution 
Heteroceras has been found in Argentina, Bulgaria, Colombia (La Guajira), the Czech Republic, France, Italy, Japan, Madagascar, Serbia and Montenegro, South Africa, Spain, Russia and the United States (Kansas, Wyoming). Related genera are Hemibaculites and Cochidites. The family, Heteroceratidae, is a derivative of the Ancyloceratidae.

References

Further reading 
 
 Arkell, et al 1957. Mesozoic Ammonoidea. Treatise on Invertebrate Paleontology, Part L, Ammonoidea. Geological Society of America and Univ. Kansas Press. 
 For illustrations see Genre Heteroceras, Orbigny 1850

Cretaceous ammonites
Ammonites of South America
Cretaceous Africa
Cretaceous Argentina
Cretaceous Asia
Cretaceous Colombia
Cretaceous Europe
Cretaceous North America
Fossils of Japan
Cretaceous France
Fossils of France
Cretaceous Italy
Fossils of Italy
Fossils of the United States
Fossils of Colombia
Cretaceous Spain
Fossils of Spain
Ancyloceratoidea
Ammonite genera